John William Causey (September 19, 1841 – October 1, 1908) was an American politician, lawyer and farmer from the state of Delaware. He was a member of the Democratic Party who served as a state senator and as a member of the U.S. House of Representatives.

Life and career
Causey was born in Milford, Delaware, attended a private school, The Albany Academy in Albany, New York, and was graduated from the Pennsylvania Agricultural College.

A Democrat, Causey was elected to the Delaware State Senate for 1875–1877 and was a delegate to the Democratic National Convention in 1884. President Grover Cleveland appointed him an internal-revenue collector for Delaware in 1885, and he served in that capacity until 1887. He served in the U.S. House of Representatives from March 4, 1891, until March 4, 1895, but was not a candidate for renomination in 1894.

Causey died at Milford and is buried there in the Odd Fellows Cemetery.

Almanac

External links
Biographical Directory of the United States Congress 
Delaware’s Members of Congress
Find a Grave 
The Political Graveyard

Places with more information
Delaware Historical Society; website; 505 North Market Street, Wilmington, Delaware 19801; (302) 655-7161
University of Delaware; Library website; 181 South College Avenue, Newark, Delaware 19717; (302) 831-2965
Newark Free Library; 750 Library Ave., Newark, Delaware; (302) 731-7550

1841 births
1908 deaths
Penn State College of Agricultural Sciences alumni
People from Milford, Delaware
Burials in Kent County, Delaware
Delaware lawyers
Democratic Party members of the United States House of Representatives from Delaware
Democratic Party Delaware state senators
19th-century American politicians
The Albany Academy alumni